The Lysiosquillidae or banded mantis shrimps are a family of mantis shrimp, comprising some of the largest known mantis shrimp species. The most common and best known species is Lysiosquillina maculata, the zebra mantis shrimp.

Natural history 
Like all mantis shrimps, banded mantis shrimps dig burrows in the sea floor. Banded mantis shrimp burrows are relatively deep, descending vertically into soft substrate. Unlike other clades, however, they rarely leave their burrows, preferring to ambush their prey from the safety of their homes.

Genera 
 Lysiosquilla Dana, 1852 
 Lysiosquillina Manning, 1995 
 Lysiosquilloides Manning, 1977

Interactions with humans 
If banded mantis shrimp leave their burrows, they may be at risk to be caught by artisnal fishers, trawls, or night lights.

References

Stomatopoda
Crustacean families